Malla Reddy University, Hyderabad (MRUH) is a private university located in Hyderabad, Telangana, India.

History

Malla Reddy University, Hyderabad (MRUH) is a private university under green field category established in the year 2020.

References

Universities and colleges in Hyderabad, India
Private universities in India
Universities established in the 2020s